The 1990 San Diego State Aztecs football team represented San Diego State University during the 1990 NCAA Division I-A football season as a member of the Western Athletic Conference (WAC).

The team was led by head coach Al Luginbill, in his second year. They played home games at Jack Murphy Stadium in San Diego. They finished the season with a record of six wins, five losses (6–5, 5–2 WAC).

Schedule

Team players in the NFL
The following were selected in the 1991 NFL Draft.

The following finished their college career in 1990, were not drafted, but played in the NFL.

Team awards

Notes

References

San Diego State
San Diego State Aztecs football seasons
San Diego State Aztecs football